Dosti may refer to:

Arts and entertainment  
 Dosti (1964 film), an Indian black-and-white Hindi film.
  Dosti (1971 film), a Pakistani Urdu film
 Dosti: Friends Forever, a 2005 Indian Hindi romantic-drama buddy film
 Dosti (album), an album by Junoon
 Dosti (2014 film), 2014 Kannada film

People 
 Albi Dosti (born 1991), Albanian footballer
 Edmond Dosti (born 1969), Albanian footballer
 Hasan Dosti (1895–1991), Albanian jurist and politician
 Jurgen Dosti (born 1991), Albanian footballer
 Victor Dosti, Albanian political prisoner and human rights activist

See also 
 
 Dəstə, a village in the Ordubad Rayon of Nakhchivan, Azerbaijan